This is a list of adult fiction books that topped The New York Times Fiction Best Seller list in 1942.

Though the bestseller list first began in 1931, it only became a national survey on August 9, 1942; previously the list only reflected sales from the New York metropolitan area.

The two most popular books that year were The Song of Bernadette, by Franz Werfel, which made the list for fifteen weeks; and The Robe, by Lloyd Douglas, which would dominate the list for the final six weeks of 1942 and most of 1943.

See also

 1942 in literature
 Lists of The New York Times Fiction Best Sellers
 Publishers Weekly list of bestselling novels in the United States in the 1940s

References

1942
.
1942 in the United States